Stare Budy may refer to the following places:
Stare Budy, Łódź Voivodeship (central Poland)
Stare Budy, Grodzisk Mazowiecki County in Masovian Voivodeship (east-central Poland)
Stare Budy, Sochaczew County in Masovian Voivodeship (east-central Poland)
Stare Budy, Wyszków County in Masovian Voivodeship (east-central Poland)
Stare Budy, Greater Poland Voivodeship (west-central Poland)